Varvara is a village in the municipality of Prozor-Rama, Bosnia and Herzegovina. It is located on the northwestern shore of Ramsko Lake.

Demographics 
According to the 2013 census, its population was 452.

References

Populated places in Prozor-Rama